Postmodern theology, also known as the continental philosophy of religion, is a philosophical and theological movement that interprets theology in light of post-Heideggerian continental philosophy, including phenomenology, post-structuralism, and deconstruction.

History
Postmodern theology emerged in the 1980s and 1990s when a handful of philosophers who took philosopher Martin Heidegger as a common point of departure began publishing influential books on theology. Some of the more notable works of the era include Jean-Luc Marion's 1982 book God Without Being, Mark C. Taylor's 1984 book Erring, Charles Winquist's 1994 book Desiring Theology, John D. Caputo's 1997 book The Prayers and Tears of Jacques Derrida, and Carl Raschke's 2000 book The End of Theology.

There are at least two branches of postmodern theology, each of which has evolved around the ideas of particular post-Heideggerian continental philosophers.  Those branches are radical orthodoxy and weak theology.

Radical orthodoxy

Radical orthodoxy is a branch of postmodern theology that has been influenced by the phenomenology of Jean-Luc Marion, Paul Ricœur, and Michel Henry, among others.

Although radical orthodoxy is informally organized, its proponents often agree on a handful of propositions. First, there is no sharp distinction between reason on the one hand and faith or revelation on the other. In addition, the world is best understood through interactions with God, even though a full understanding of God is never possible. Those interactions include culture, language, history, technology, and theology. Further, God directs people toward truth, which is never fully available to them. In fact, a full appreciation of the physical world is only possible through a belief in transcendence. Finally, salvation is found through interactions with God and others.

Prominent advocates of radical orthodoxy include John Milbank, Catherine Pickstock, and Graham Ward.

Weak theology
Weak theology is a branch of postmodern theology that has been influenced by the deconstructive thought of Jacques Derrida, including Derrida's description of a moral experience he calls "the weak force." Weak theology rejects the idea that God is an overwhelming physical or metaphysical force. Instead, God is an unconditional claim without any force whatsoever. As a claim without force, the God of weak theology does not intervene in nature. As a result, weak theology emphasizes the responsibility of humans to act in this world here and now. John D. Caputo is a prominent advocate of the movement.

Leading thinkers

John D. Caputo
Richard Kearney
Mario Kopić
Jean-Luc Marion
Françoise Meltzer
John Milbank
James Olthuis
Catherine Pickstock
Carl Raschke
Peter Rollins
Mary-Jane Rubenstein
James K.A. Smith
Mark C. Taylor
Gabriel Vahanian
Gianni Vattimo
Charles Winquist
Catherine Keller
Mikhail Epstein

See also

 Christian revival
 Neo-orthodoxy
Post-critical (Michael Polanyi)
Postcritique
 Peter L. Berger, Lutheran theologian and co-author of The Social Construction of Reality
 John Deely, Catholic philosopher and semiotician (Postmodern philosophy#Definitional issues)
 Queer theology
 Religious pluralism
 Restoration movement
 
Talal Asad, Foucauldian Muslim writer

Christian theologians discussing 'postmodernism'

Notes

Further reading
Caputo, John D. (2004). "Jacques Derrida (1930–2004)", Journal of Cultural and Religious Theory, Vol. 6, No. 1, December 2004.
Caputo, John D. The Weakness of God: A Theology of the Event. Bloomington: Indiana University Press, 2006. 
Caputo, John D.  What Would Jesus Deconstruct?:  The Good News of Postmodernity for the Church.  Grand Rapids: Baker Academic, 2007.
Engel, Ulrich (2001). "Religion and Violence: Plea for a 'weak' theology in tempore belli", New Blackfriars, Vol. 82, No. 970, pp. 558–560, December 2001.
Foster, Stephen (2019) "Theology as Repetition: John Macquarrie in Conversation" (Eugene: Wipf and Stock, 2019)
Heltzel, Peter G. (2006). "The Weakness of God: A Review of John D. Caputo's The Weakness of God: A Theology of the Event", Journal of Cultural and Religious Theory, Vol. 7, No. 2, Spring/Summer 2006.
Marion, Jean-Luc.  God Without Being.  Chicago: University of Chicago Press, 1995.
Raschke, Carl (2000).  The End of Theology.  Denver, CO: The Davies Group, 2000.  Originally published as The Alchemy of the Word: Language and the End of Theology, Missoula, MT: Scholars Press, 1979).
Raschke, Carl (2006). "The Weakness of God... and of Theological Thought for that Matter", Journal for Cultural and Religious Theory, Vol. 8, No. 1, Winter 2006.
Rubenstein, Mary-Jane (2009). Strange Wonder: The Closure of Metaphysics and the Opening of Awe (New York: Columbia University Press, 2009 [cloth], 2011 [paper]).
Rubenstein, Mary-Jane (2018). Pantheologies: Gods, Worlds, Monsters (New York: Columbia University Press, 2018 [cloth], 2021 [paper]).
Smith, James K.A. Who's Afraid of Postmodernism?: Taking Derrida, Lyotard, and Foucault to Church.  Grand Rapids: Baker Academic, 2006.
Swain, Lincoln.  The Why People: Faith, False Prophets and End Times  Detroit: Atomic Quill Press, 2011.
Taylor, Mark C.  Erring: A Postmodern A/Theology.  Chicago: University of Chicago Press, 1987.
Taylor, Victor.  "From Alchemy to Revolution: A Conversation with Carl A. Raschke", Journal for Cultural and Religious Theory, Vol 12, No. 3, Spring 2014, 149-60.
Winquist, Charles.  Desiring Theology.  Chicago: University of Chicago Press, 1994.

Christian theological movements
Christian philosophy
Types of existentialism
Postmodern theory
Christianity
Christian continental philosophers and theologians
Religious existentialism